Bernard Friedland is an American professor of engineering. He is Distinguished Professor of Electrical and Computer Engineering at the New Jersey Institute of Technology.

Biography 
Friedland was born in New York City and graduated from Brooklyn Technical High School. He received his B.A., B.S., M.S., and Ph.D. degrees all from Columbia University. He taught at Columbia University, New York University, Technion – Israel Institute of Technology, and joined the faculty of New Jersey Institute of Technology in 1990. His research has focused on system and control theory and its applications. For 28 years, he was a manager at Kearfott Guidance & Navigation.

Friedland is the recipient of the 1982 Rufus Oldenburger Medal from the American Society of Mechanical Engineers (ASME), citing his "creative extensions to the theory of optimal control and recursive filtering and its practical application to the design of guidance and navigation systems." He is also a fellow of the ASME and the Institute of Electrical and Electronics Engineers.

References 

Living people
American engineers
Columbia School of Engineering and Applied Science alumni
Columbia College (New York) alumni
Fellow Members of the IEEE
Fellows of the American Society of Mechanical Engineers
New Jersey Institute of Technology faculty
Columbia University faculty
New York University faculty
Brooklyn Technical High School alumni
Year of birth missing (living people)